The Oslo Stock Exchange (Norwegian: Oslo Børs) serves as the main market for trading in the shares of Norwegian companies. It opens at 9:00am and closes 4:30pm local time (CET). In addition to a wide range of domestic companies, the OSE attracts a lot of international companies within petroleum, shipping and other related areas.

The stock exchanged opened in April 1819 (as Christiania Børs), but didn't list stocks and shares until 1 March 1881. The first list of prices showed 23 shares. From 1920 to 1936, whaling shares accounted for about 50% of total turnover.

In addition to Norwegian and foreign companies with shares listed on Oslo Stock Exchange, the list also includes equity certificates issued by Norwegian savings banks. The difference between shares and equity certificates  is connected to the ownership of the company's assets and leverage in the administrative bodies of the banks.

Currently listed companies

See also
 List of companies delisted from Oslo Stock Exchange
 List of companies listed on Oslo Axess
 Oslo Stock Exchange
 OSEAX
 OBX Index

References

Companies listed on the Oslo Stock Exchange
Oslo Stock Exchange
Oslo Stock Exchange